The Listen is a South Korean television program that airs on SBS.

The first season, with the sub-title Wind Blows (바람이 분다), was aired weekly on Sundays at 00:05 (KST), beginning September 26 to October 17, 2021.

The second season, with the sub-title The Voices We Love (우리가 사랑한 목소리), currently airs weekly on Saturdays at 00:15 (KST) beginning November 5, 2022.

Synopsis
A music travel real variety program that follows vocalists going on a busking trip.

Season 1 features five female vocalists forming a new project group "The Listen", as they explore around Mokpo and hold busking events in various venues in the city. Through the program, five solo singles (one each from the cast members) and one collaboration single have been released.

Season 2 features seven male vocalists, exploring and busking at various venues starting from Sinchon in Seoul, to Gwangju.

Cast

Season 1 (Wind Blows)
 Solji (EXID)
 Kim Na-young
 Kassy
 Seunghee (Oh My Girl)
 Hynn

Session musicians
 Kim Dong-min – keyboards
 Chae Ji-ho – guitar

Season 2 (The Voices We Love)
 Huh Gak
 Shin Yong-jae (2F)
 Kim Won-joo (2F)
 Onestar
 Son Dong-woon (Highlight)
 Juho
 Kim Hee-jae

Discography (Season 1)

The Day I Loved You

Letter

I Wish

Waste of Emotions

You Are Falling All Night

Still Parting From Us

The Listen

Chart rankings

Discography (Season 2)

My First Love

What I Couldn't Say To You

Make A Memory

Forest

Save Me

Someday

Only You

Shining You

My All

My All

We Got Lost

Somewhere Only We Know

Scent of Yours

Chart rankings (selected)

References

South Korean reality television series
2021 South Korean television series debuts
2021 South Korean television series endings
Seoul Broadcasting System original programming
Korean-language television shows
South Korean variety television shows